Rocky River Presbyterian Church is a historic Presbyterian church located near Rocky River, Cabarrus County, North Carolina. The property includes the Greco-Italianate style brick church (1860-1861); a frame Session House (1839); a small cemetery dating to 1814; and the two-story, brick Greek Revival and Italianate style Manse (1873).

It was listed on the National Register of Historic Places in 1986.

References

Presbyterian churches in North Carolina
Churches on the National Register of Historic Places in North Carolina
Greek Revival church buildings in North Carolina
Italianate architecture in North Carolina
Churches completed in 1839
Churches in Cabarrus County, North Carolina
National Register of Historic Places in Cabarrus County, North Carolina
Italianate church buildings in the United States